Black Angel is the fourth studio album by British singer-songwriter Mica Paris. It was released on 10 August 1998 by Cooltempo / Chrysalis, her first and last for these labels, and features production from Boy George and Raphael Saadiq.

Recording
In the book, Straight, Boy George expressed, 'I wrote and produced "Black Angel" for Brit soul diva Mica Paris. Working with such a soaring voice — which could reach notes I could only dream of — was a thrilling experience.'

Reception

Critical
Reviewing the single "Carefree" for Billboard, Larry Flick wrote, "Carefree" 'shows the enduring chanteuse in tip-top vocal form, floating a glorious, deceptively simple performance over a deliciously soulful groove. Equally appropriate for club turntables and home sound systems, this Cooltempo U.K. release leaves you desperate for a full-length album.' In the book Companion to Contemporary Black British Culture, Derek A. Bardowell heralded Paris as 'UK R'n'B's most respected vocalist. Despite struggling to find a market to fit her raspy but classically soulful voice, Paris has been a major musical force'. Bardowell also wrote that 'Paris found musical liberation in 1998 and assumed more creative control on her fourth effort [...] Black Angel is the greatest illustration of Paris' innovative talent.

Commercial
Black Angel debuted and peaked at number fifty-nine on the UK Albums Chart making it Paris' first album to miss out on a place in the UK Top 40. The album only charted for one week, meaning it failed to live up to the sales of her previous three studio albums. Black Angel was Paris' last album to chart in the UK until Gospel in 2020.

Singles
Three singles were released from Black Angel. The lead single, "Stay", fared poorly in the charts, especially for a lead single from an album, entering and peaking at number forty then falling to number seventy-two the next week before dropping out of the charts completely. The second single from the album, "Carefree", performed worse than the previous release and became Paris' first single to fail to chart within the UK Top 200. The third and final single to be released from the album was the title track, "Black Angel". This performed better than the previous single, however it only managed to chart at number seventy-two, before falling off the charts the following week. This was Mica's last single to chart in the UK to date.

Track listing

Notes:
Track 4 contains a sample from "Let the Good Times Roll" by Little Beaver
Track 7 contains a sample from "Could You Be Loved" by Bob Marley and the Wailers

Personnel
Credits adapted from the album's information on AllMusic and the liner notes.

 Managerial
 Executive producers – Mica Paris

 Visuals and Imagery
 Design – Ian Ross 
 Photography – Regan Cameron, Jamie Morgan
 Video image – Zoe Broach
 Calligraphy – Ruth Rowland

 Performance credits
 Lead vocals – Mica Paris
 Background vocals – Mica Paris, Chris Ballin, Jackie Farris, Jackie Gouche, James Ingram, Julian Jackson, Yana Johnson, Marva King, Jackie Simley, Stephen Simmonds, Alisha Warren

 Instruments
 Bass – Boy George, Nick Hannan, Raphael Saadiq, Stuart Zender
 Drums – Dodge, Julian Jackson, John Paris
 Flugelhorn – Colin Graham 
 Flute – Chris Margary, 
 Guitar – Kevan Frost, Randy Hope-Taylor, John Themis
 Keyboards – Peter Adams, Julian Jackson, Paul Johnson, Kojo
 Percussion – Julian Jackson
 Piano – Marcus Brown, James Ingram, Wayne Linsey, 
 Saxophone – Ben Castle, Chris Margary, Jay Work
 Recorder – Gareth Lucking, Jummy Sloan 
 Trombone – Skip Waring
 Trumpet – Raul d'Oliveira, Colin Graham, Skip Waring

 Technical and production
 Arrangement – Mica Paris, Richard Hewson (strings), Julian Jackson (guitar)
 Engineering – Nick Hannan, Alan Jenkins, Avril MacKintosh, Bill Malina, 
 Engineering assistants – Paul Naguna
 Mixing – Marcus Brown, Guy Farley,  
 Record producer – Boy George, Guy Farley, Richie Stevens, Stephen Simmonds, Julian Jackson, Mica Paris, Omar
 Programming – Marcus Brown, Julian Jackson, Richie Stevens
Recorded at Jam Shack Recordings, Los Angeles; Eden Studios, London; Blah Street Studios, Hampshire; Roundhouse Studios, London; Marcus Studios, London; The Green Room

Charts

References

1998 albums
Mica Paris albums
Cooltempo Records albums
Chrysalis Records albums